Events in the year 2018 in the Federated States of Micronesia.

Incumbents
President: Peter M. Christian
Vice President: Yosiwo George

Events
28 September – Crash landing of the Air Niugini Flight 73

Deaths

12 February – Leo Falcam, President 1999–2003 (b. 1935).

References

 
2010s in the Federated States of Micronesia
Years of the 21st century in the Federated States of Micronesia
Micronesia
Micronesia